Ben Joseph James Wells (born 30 July 2000) is an English cricketer. He made his List A debut on 25 July 2021, for Gloucestershire in the 2021 Royal London One-Day Cup.

Career
Originally from Bath, Wells attended Monkton Combe School. He graduated with a BSc in Physics from the University of Exeter in 2021 where he was also captain of the First XI. He was part of the Somerset academy and played for their second XI before signing a contract with Gloucestershire in June 2021. He made his first-class debut on 12 September 2021, for Gloucestershire in the 2021 County Championship. He made his Twenty20 debut on 29 May 2022, for Gloucestershire against the Sri Lanka Cricket Development XI during their tour of England.

References

External links
 

2000 births
Living people
English cricketers
Dorset cricketers
Gloucestershire cricketers
Sportspeople from Bath, Somerset
People educated at Monkton Combe School
Alumni of the University of Exeter